In 1996 the Russian Top League was extended to 18 clubs. The following is a summary of 1996 teams and people.

Overview

Standings

As Alania and Spartak finished at the top of the table with equal points, the title was decided in a championship play-off.

Results

Top goalscorers

Medal squads

See also
 1996 Russian First League
 1996 Russian Second League
 1996 Russian Third League

External links
RSSSF

1996
1
Russia
Russia